Mario Fernández Ruyales (born 25 September 1984) is a Spanish footballer who plays as a goalkeeper.

Club career
Born in Madrid, Ruyales spent the vast majority of his career in the lower leagues. His professional input consisted of 18 Segunda División games in the 2008–09 season for Sevilla Atlético, his debut arriving on 9 November 2008 in a 2–2 away draw against Deportivo Alavés. He was also on goal on 5 April of the following year, as the team lost 0–8 at Hércules CF and was eventually relegated.

Ruyales also represented CD Leganés B, both reserve teams of Atlético Madrid, Gimnástica Torrelavega, Alicante CF, CF Palencia, Real Oviedo and UCAM Murcia CF.

References

External links

1984 births
Living people
Footballers from Madrid
Spanish footballers
Association football goalkeepers
Segunda División players
Segunda División B players
Tercera División players
CD Leganés B players
Atlético Madrid C players
Atlético Madrid B players
Gimnástica de Torrelavega footballers
Sevilla Atlético players
Alicante CF footballers
CF Palencia footballers
Real Oviedo players
UCAM Murcia CF players